Pseudogonatodes is a genus of sphaerodactylid geckos, often known as South American clawed geckos, containing seven described species. Like most sphaerodactylines (South American sphaerodactylids), Pseudogonatodes are miniaturized geckos and among the smallest living lizards. They are diurnal and terrestrial, foraging among leaf litter and rotting wood on the ground. Prey items are primarily small arthropods such as springtails, insect larvae, and orthopterans (crickets and kin). Though locally common and not strongly threatened with extinction, most species occupy restricted ranges in remote tropical forests. The most widespread and well-studied species, Pseudogonatodes guianensis, is found throughout the Amazon rainforest.

Species
The following species and subspecies are recognized as being valid.
Pseudogonatodes barbouri  – Barbour's clawed gecko
Pseudogonatodes furvus  – Colombian clawed gecko
Pseudogonatodes gasconi 
Pseudogonatodes guianensis  – Amazon pigmy gecko
Pseudogonatodes guianensis amazonicus  – Amazonas Guyana clawed gecko
Pseudogonatodes guianensis guianensis 
Pseudogonatodes lunulatus  – Venezuela clawed gecko
Pseudogonatodes manessi 
Pseudogonatodes peruvianus  – Peru clawed gecko

Nota bene: A binomial authority in parentheses indicates that the species was originally described in a genus other than Pseudogonatodes.

References

Further reading
Ruthven AG (1915). "Description of a New Genus and Species of Lizard of the Family Gekkonidæ". Occasional Papers of the Museum of Zoology, University of Michigan (19): 1-3. (Pseudogonatodes, new genus; P. furvus, new species).

 
Lizard genera
Taxa named by Alexander Grant Ruthven